is a Japanese professional baseball starting pitcher for the Orix Buffaloes in Japan's Nippon Professional Baseball.

External links

NPB.com

1981 births
Living people
People from Suita
Japanese baseball players
Nippon Professional Baseball pitchers
Orix Buffaloes players
Japanese baseball coaches
Nippon Professional Baseball coaches